Kòseégbé (English: Immovable) is a 1995 Yoruba drama film directed by Tunde Kelani based on a stage play of the same name by Akinwunmi Isola. The cast consisted of actors from the Obafemi Awolowo University theatre. It was released through Mainframe Films and Television Productions.

Plot 
Koseegbe tells the story of a morally upright customs officer who replaces a senior official who was dismissed on account of corruption. At his new post, he attempts to sanitize the system as he gets push back from the equally corrupt junior officers. In order to orchestrate his dismissal, the junior officers frame him for illicit behaviour he is however able to secure their confession and absolve himself.

Cast 

 Kola Oyewo
 Wole Amele
 Jide Kosoko
 Toyin A Babatope
Yetunde Ogunsola
Joke Muyiwa
Yemi Sodimu
Laide Adewale
Gboyega Ajayi
Jimoh Fakoyejo
Faith Eboigbe
Taiye Adegboyega
Feso Oyewole
Peter Fatomilola

Production 
Koseegbe was Tunde Kelani's third film and his first work with Akinwunmi Isola. It started out as a stage play of the same name by Isola who was unable to write the script for film so Kelani gave him the script for Driving Miss Daisy to use as a sample. It was released on VHS in 1995.

It was listed as one of the 10 best selling Yoruba movies.

References 

Yoruba-language films
1995 films
Films directed by Tunde Kelani
Nigerian drama films